Pentapogon is a genus of Australian plants in the grass family. The only known species is Pentapogon quadrifidus. It is native to every Australian State except Queensland, and is also naturalised on the South Island of New Zealand. (A former Pentapogon species, Pentapogon drummondii, is now placed in Calamagrostis as Calamagrostis drummondii.)

References

External links
Grassbase - The World Online Grass Flora

Pooideae
Monotypic Poaceae genera
Flora of Australia
Taxa named by Henri Ernest Baillon
Taxa named by Jacques Labillardière